Michelle Grangaud (11 October 1941 – 15 January 2022) was a French poet.

Biography
During her childhood, Grangaud discovered the works of Marcel Proust. In 1962, she left Algeria and settled in Montpellier. She then published sixteen other works in collaboration with other publishers.

Grangaud was elected a member of Oulipo, one of the few women in the group. A specialist in anagrams, she created the sexagrammatine constraint and the "avion". 

She died in Brie-Comte-Robert on 15 January 2022, at the age of 80.

Works
Mémento fragment (1987)
Stations (1990)
Renaîtres (1990)
Geste (1991)
Jours le jour (1994)
On verra bien (1996)
Poèmes fondus (1997)
État civil (1998)
Souvenirs de ma vie collective (2000)
Calendrier des poètes (2001)
Calendrier des fêtes nationales (2003)
Les Temps traversés (2010)
Le bébégaiement du beau Beaubourg (2011)

References

1941 births
2022 deaths
20th-century French women
21st-century French women
20th-century French poets
21st-century French poets
Oulipo members
Pieds-Noirs
People from Algiers